The Codex Magliabechiano is a pictorial Aztec codex created during the mid-16th century, in the early Spanish colonial period. It is representative of a set of codices known collectively as the Magliabechiano Group (others in the group include the Codex Tudela and the Codex Ixtlilxochitl). The Codex Magliabechiano is based on an earlier unknown codex, which is assumed to have been the prototype for the Magliabechiano Group. It is named after Antonio Magliabechi, a 17th-century Italian manuscript collector, and is held in the Biblioteca Nazionale Centrale, Florence, Italy.

It was created on European paper, with drawings and Spanish language text on both sides of each page. The Codex Magliabechiano is primarily a religious document. Various deities, indigenous religious rites, costumes, and cosmological beliefs are depicted. Its 92 pages are almost a glossary of cosmological and religious elements. The 52-year cycle is depicted, as well as the 20 day-names of the tonalpohualli, and the 18 monthly feasts.

Images 

SVG renderings

Full pages of icons

Icons

References

Further reading
 Carrasco, David. (2001). The Oxford Encyclopedia of Mesoamerican Cultures: The Civilizations of Mexico and Central America. Oxford. .
 Facsimile: Codex Magliabechiano, Florence, Biblioteca Nazionale Centrale, Middle of the 16th century; Akademische Druck- u. Verlagsanstalt (ADEVA) Graz 1970. Colour facsimile edition of the manuscript in possession of the Biblioteca Nazionale Centrale di Firenze. 186 pp., size: 215 x 155 mm. Encased in box with leather spine. Introduction (in German), summaries (in English and Spanish): F. Anders, Vienna, 78 pp., 1 plate; CODICES SELECTI, Vol. XXIII

External links
Complete color facsimiles of the hand-painted manuscript in the National Central Library in Florence
Codex Magliabechiano (Graz, 1970)
Codex Magliabecchiano (Rome, 1904)

Magliabechiano